James Esmond Farrell (14 October 1909 – 1 September 1968) was a New Zealand diplomat.

Biography
Farrell was born in Ashburton on 14 October 1909. He was educated at St. Thomas's Academy in Oamaru and Sacred Heart College in Auckland. In 1935 he married Mercia Taylor with whom he had three sons and a daughter

He was a member of the Oamaru Trotting Club executive from 1931 to 1965 and was for 12 years president of the club and later vice-president of the New Zealand Trotting Conference. He also served for several years as a member of the Totalisator Agency Board. In World War II Farrell served in the Royal New Zealand Air Force.

He attended the University of Canterbury, where he graduated bachelor of laws in 1945. At university he was nominated for a Rhodes Scholarship. Farrell was a barrister and solicitor and the senior partner in the legal firm of Hjorring, Tait and Farrell. He was also a contributor to the Law Journal.

Farrell studied international affairs at several European and American based organisations and lectured extensively on the subject himself. He was also a radio speaker on European and Commonwealth affairs. Farrell was the president of the Oamaru branch of the Royal Over-Seas League as well as an associate member of the British Atlantic Committee and the British Society for International Understanding.

Farrell was the Oamaru electorate president of the National Party. Farrell was also a member of the National Party's Dominion Council.

In 1965 Farrell was appointed by the Second National Government as New Zealand's Resident High Commissioner to India. He held the post until 1968.

He died in Oamaru on 1 September 1968. He was survived by his wife and four children.

Notes

References

1909 births
1968 deaths
People from Ashburton, New Zealand
Royal New Zealand Air Force personnel
New Zealand military personnel of World War II
20th-century New Zealand lawyers
University of Canterbury alumni
New Zealand National Party politicians
High Commissioners of New Zealand to India